Luke Alex Bowen (born 26 January 1986 in Harlow, Essex) is a former motorcycle speedway rider from England, who rode with the Rye House Rockets in the Premier League.

Luke was with the Hoddesdon-based club for much of his career, racing at first with the Rye House Raiders before progressing to the Rockets after overcoming some serious injuries, winning the Premier League Championship in 2007.  In 2016, Luke joined Kent Kings, skippering this National League team.

His father Kevin also rode for the Rye House Rockets in the early 1980s.

References 

1986 births
Living people
British speedway riders
English motorcycle racers
Sportspeople from Harlow
Rye House Rockets riders